= Daniel Jordan Fiddle Foundation =

American autism organization

Daniel Jordan Fiddle Foundation, Inc.
- Abbreviation: DJF
- Founded: January 31, 2000; 26 years ago
- Founder: Linda J. Walder
- Tax ID no.: 22-3704205
- Legal status: 501(c)(3) nonprofit organization
- Headquarters: Edgewater, New Jersey, United States
- President, Trustee: Linda J. Walder
- Revenue: $76,902 (2014)
- Expenses: $147,860 (2014)
- Employees: 0 (2014)
- Volunteers: 7 (2014)
- Website: www.djfiddlefoundation.org

The Daniel Jordan Fiddle Foundation, Inc. (DJFF) is a national all-volunteer-run 501(c)(3) not-for-profit organization that focuses exclusively on adults with autism-spectrum disorder. The DJF mission is to develop, advocate for and support programs through grant awards that enrich the lives of adolescents and adults with autism. The guiding principle of Foundation is to honor the individuality of each person with autism-spectrum disorder so that each may participate throughout their lifetime in vocational, recreational, educational and residential opportunities that are suitable, stimulating and sustainable and allow for maximum integration in the community.

== Background ==
Based in Charleston, SC, The Daniel Jordan Fiddle Foundation (DJFF) was founded in 2000 by Linda J. Walder, and named in memory of her son Danny who had autism-spectrum disorder.

DJF developed an informational brochure entitled, 'Autism, Epilepsy & Seizures: How To Recognize The Signs and Basic First Aid When You Do.' It contains general information about autism and epilepsy as well as about the co-condition of the two.

The foundation was instrumental in supporting New Jersey Sen. Robert Menendez’ re-introduction of The Helping HANDS for Autism Act of 2009, a three-part legislative package that includes a program to guide families seeking services and care, increased awareness among first responders, and housing for adults with ASD. New Jersey has the highest rate of autism in the United States.

In 2010, DJF developed a new level of program development and funding, known as The Daniel Jordan Fiddle Foundation Signature Grant Programs, which awards grants to exemplary and replicable programs that address critical needs and gaps in services and supports for adults with Autism Spectrum Disorders (ASD).

In 2014, DJF established " The Daniel Jordan Fiddle Foundation Adult Autism Research Fund" at Yale University Medical School to focus on research relating to adults living with autism. With a $100,000 endowment fund "The Daniel Jordan Fiddle Foundation Transition and Adult Programs" was established at University of Miami's Center for Autism and Related Disabilities as a center for the development and dissemination of model programs and resources that serve adults on the autism spectrum.

The Daniel Jordan Fiddle Foundation Leader in Autism Award was established in 2016, to recognize businesses and organizations who value and support autistic adults.
